James Walsh (born 26 September 1948) is an Irish equestrian. He competed in the individual dressage event at the 1988 Summer Olympics.

References

External links
 

1948 births
Living people
Irish male equestrians
Irish dressage riders
Olympic equestrians of Ireland
Equestrians at the 1988 Summer Olympics
Place of birth missing (living people)